The following lists events that happened during 1998 in Cape Verde.

Incumbents
President: António Mascarenhas Monteiro
Prime Minister: Carlos Veiga

Events
Bolsa de Valores de Cabo Verde (Cape Verdean Stock Exchange) established in Praia
Cabo Verde Express airline established
May 11: Gualberto do Rosário becomes Deputy Prime Minister
September 28: a TACV de Havilland Canada DHC-6 Twin Otter (registered D4-CAX) crash-landed at Francisco Mendes International Airport in Praia, killing one
November: Labour and Solidarity Party (Partido de Trabalho e Solidariedade, PTS) established

Sports
CS Mindelense won the Cape Verdean Football Championship

Births
June 14: Jovane Cabral, footballer

References

 
Years of the 20th century in Cape Verde
1990s in Cape Verde
Cape Verde